Events in the year 1874 in Iceland.

Incumbents 

 Monarch: Christian IX
 Minister for Iceland: Christian Sophus Klein

Events 

 5 January − The post of Minister for Iceland is established with Christian Sophus Klein being the first minister.
 The Danish krone was introduced to Iceland, replacing the earlier Danish currency, the rigsdaler.
 Denmark grants Iceland a constitution and limited home rule.
 Freedom of Religion is introduced in Iceland.
 Ísafold newspaper is founded.
 Reykjavik Women's Gymnasium is established.
 Þjóðhátíð is held for the first time.

References 

 
1870s in Iceland
Years of the 19th century in Iceland
Iceland
Iceland